À l'Olympia (meaning At the Olympia) is the second live album by Canadian singer Celine Dion, released on 21 November 1994 by Columbia Records. It features primarily French-language songs, mainly from Dion chante Plamondon (1991), but also includes English-language hits: "The Power of Love", "Where Does My Heart Beat Now", "Love Can Move Mountains" and "Calling You". À l'Olympia was certified Platinum by the International Federation of the Phonographic Industry, denoting sales of over one million copies in Europe.

Content

The album was recorded on 28 and 29 September 1994, during two sold-out concerts at the Paris Olympia. Among songs from singer's previous French album Dion chante Plamondon, Dion performed also "Calling You", (Academy Award-nominated song from Bagdad Café), "Quand on n'a que l'amour" (originally by Jacques Brel), and a medley of songs from the Starmania musical, including two songs unavailable on Dion previous releases: "Quand on arrive en ville" and "Naziland, ce soir on danse" (full English version of that song called "Tonight We Dance (Extravagance!)" was recorded by Dion and included on the Tycoon compilation in 1992).

Although À l'Olympia was unavailable in most important music markets (United States, United Kingdom, Japan, Australia), the B-sides of English singles released there in 1995 and 1996 included tracks from that album.

The video with this concert was never released.

"Quand on n'a que l'amour", "Elle" and "Medley Starmania" were included on Dion's 2005 French compilation On ne change pas.

Shows at the Olympia were a part of The Colour of My Love Tour.

Critical reception
AllMusic said that "the material sounds great live" and Dion's "voice as always a technical marvel".

Commercial performance
The album has sold one million copies in Europe alone and was certified Platinum by the IFPI. À l'Olympia has sold 200,000 copies in Canada and was certified Platinum. It was also certified Platinum in France. The album peaked at number three in Quebec, number ten in France and number 31 in Canada, as Quebec sales did not factor into the Canadian Albums chart at that time. On the Belgian Wallonia chart, which is available only since April 1995, À l'Olympia reached number 19.

Track listing

Charts

Weekly charts

Year-end charts

Certifications and sales

Release history

References

External links
 

1994 live albums
Albums recorded at the Olympia (Paris)
Celine Dion live albums